The Greek men's under-19 national basketball team (Greek youth national basketball team), is the representative for Greece in men's international youth basketball competitions, and it is organized and run by the Hellenic Basketball Federation. The Greek men's under-19 national basketball team represents Greece at the FIBA Under-19 World Cup.

FIBA Under-19 World Cup

Team
Roster for the 2019 FIBA Under-19 Basketball World Cup

References

Under
Men's national under-19 basketball teams